The Barred Road (translit. Al-Tareeq al-Masdood) is a 1958 Egyptian drama/romance film.

Directed by the Egyptian film director Salah Abu Seif, this film is based on a novel with the same name written by the Egyptian novelist Ihsan Abdel Quddous. The film was co-written by El Sayed Bedeir and the Nobel Prize-winning writer Naguib Mahfouz. It starred Faten Hamama and Ahmed Mazhar. The film received an award from the Egyptian Catholic Center for Cinema and was selected one of the top 150 films in Egypt in 1996.

Plot 

Faten Hamama plays Fayza, a young student who lives with her family after the death of her father. Left with no money, her mother (Zouzou Mady) is forced to turn her house into an illegal gambling house. Fayza opposes her mother's solution. Munir (Ahmed Mazhar) is a writer who meets Fayza and falls in love with her but she rejects him. Fayza decides to leave to the countryside where she works as a teacher in a small school. Fayza gets into trouble in the school and, desperate and hopeless, decides to walk in her mother's path. Munir convinces Fayza to stop.

Cast 
Faten Hamama as Fayza	
Ahmed Mazhar as Munir
Shukry Sarhan as Ahmed
Zouzou Mady as Fayza's mother
Khayria Ahmed
Ferdoos Mohammed
Tewfik El Dekn
Naima Wasfy

References

External links 

1958 films
1950s Arabic-language films
Films based on Egyptian novels
Films based on romance novels
1958 romantic drama films
Egyptian romantic drama films